Percival Cyril Pitt (8 September 1883 – 30 June 1968) was an Australian rules footballer who played with Carlton in the Victorian Football League (VFL).

Notes

External links 

Percy Pitt's profile at Blueseum

1883 births
Australian rules footballers from Melbourne
Carlton Football Club players
Essendon Association Football Club players
1968 deaths
People from North Melbourne